Progress 39 was a Soviet unmanned Progress cargo spacecraft, which was launched in December 1988 to resupply the Mir EO-4 expedition aboard the Mir space station.

Launch
Progress 39 launched on 25 December 1988 from the Baikonur Cosmodrome in the Kazakh SSR. It used a Soyuz-U2 rocket.

Docking
Progress 39 docked with the aft port of the Kvant-1 module of Mir on 27 December 1988 at 05:35:10 UTC, and was undocked on 7 February 1989 at 06:45:34 UTC.

Decay
It remained in orbit until 7 February 1989, when it was deorbited. The deorbit burn occurred at around 12:49 UTC and the mission ended at 13:49 UTC.

See also

 1988 in spaceflight
 List of Progress missions
 List of uncrewed spaceflights to Mir

References

Progress (spacecraft) missions
1988 in the Soviet Union
Spacecraft launched in 1988
Spacecraft which reentered in 1989
Spacecraft launched by Soyuz-U rockets